Robert W. Raugh (September 23, 1906 – December 17, 1983) was an American football coach.  He was the 22nd head football coach at Washburn University in Topeka, Kansas serving  for two seasons, from 1942 to 1943, compiling a record of 3–10–2.  Raugh was an athlete at the University of Nebraska–Lincoln.  Before coming to Washburn in 1942, he coached high school athletics in Maxwell, Iowa, Norfolk, Nebraska, and Colby, Kansas.

Head coaching record

College

References

External links
 

1906 births
1983 deaths
Washburn Ichabods football coaches
High school basketball coaches in the United States
High school football coaches in Kansas
University of Nebraska–Lincoln alumni
Sportspeople from Des Moines, Iowa
Sportspeople from Lincoln, Nebraska